Eupithecia moecha is a moth in the family Geometridae. It is found in the southeastern part of European Russia and north-western Kazakhstan.

References

Moths described in 1902
moecha
Moths of Europe
Moths of Asia